William Chapman may refer to:

Politicians
William Chapman (MP for Arundel), in 1416, Member of Parliament (MP) for Arundel
William Chapman (MP for Bath) (fl. 1626), MP for Bath
William Chapman (MP for Dover), British MP for Dover, 1685–1689
William Chapman (MP for Athboy), MP for Athboy
William W. Chapman (1808–1892), American politician and lawyer
Bill Chapman (politician) (1910–1971), Australian politician and member of the New South Wales Legislative Assembly

Others
William Chapman (baritone) (1923–2012), American opera singer and actor
William Chapman (cricketer), English professional cricketer
William Chapman (engineer) (1749–1832), English engineer
William Chapman (poet) (1850–1917), Canadian poet
William Chapman (doctor) (1797–1867), British-born doctor in New Zealand
William Chapman (journalist) (born 1930), American journalist
William L. Chapman II (died 2015), American shot by police, see Death of William Chapman
Bill Chapman (footballer), former footballer who represented New Zealand
Billy Chapman (1902–1967), English footballer
William E. Chapman, American diplomat

See also
Robert William Chapman (disambiguation)